Lanzo may refer to:

Medicine
Lansoprazole, a proton-pump inhibitor. Its Swedish brand name is "Lanzo"

Geography
Lanzo d'Intelvi, a frazione in the municipality of Alta Valle Intelvi, Province of Como, Lombardy, Italy
Lanzo Torinese, a municipality in the Province of Turin, Piedmont, Italy
Monastero di Lanzo, a municipality in the Province of Turin, Piedmont, Italy
Stura di Lanzo, a river in Piedmont, Italy

See also
Lanza, disambiguation page
Lanze, a German municipality in Schleswig-Holstein